The 2012 Pan American Women's Junior Handball Championship took place in Santo Domingo from March 15 – March 19. It acts as the Pan American qualifying tournament for the 2012 Women's Junior World Handball Championship.

Teams

Preliminary round

Group A

Group B

Placement 5th–8th

7th/8th

5th/6th

Final round

Semifinals

Bronze medal match

Gold medal match

Final standing

2012 in handball
Pan American Women's Junior Handball Championship